A devious lick (also known as a diabolical lick, dastardly lick, or nefarious lick, amongst other names) was a viral 2021 TikTok challenge in which North American middle school and high school students posted videos of themselves stealing, vandalizing, or showing off one or more items they stole in their school, typically from a bathroom (or, in some cases, merely pretending to have done so). The trend has resulted in the arrests of many students  as well as various warnings being issued by police departments. It also allegedly spread to some schools in Latin America, England, Germany and Australia.

History
The trend originated on September 1, 2021, after TikTok user jugg4elias posted a video showing a box of disposable masks they claimed to have stolen from school, with the caption "A month into school... devious lick". Similar videos with the term "devious lick" soon flooded the platform, with students stealing items from bathrooms, such as soap and paper towel dispensers, toilet paper roll shields, urinals, sinks, mirrors, and floor and ceiling tiles. Eventually, students allegedly began stealing items outside of the bathrooms, including exit signs, telephones, smart boards, and microscopes. The videos were typically accompanied by a sped-up version of Lil B's "Ski Ski BasedGod". The videos' captions often modify the name of the trend with synonymous adjectives, such as "mischievous" or "diabolical licks," etc. 

Various schools began taking action against the trend, warning students of serious school consequences and arrests. Some schools in New Brunswick had reported their toilets being sprayed with red food coloring and other forms of vandalism. In British Columbia, 42 soap dispensers were ripped out from school bathrooms within the span of one week. In Huron County, Ontario, a bathroom had all of its urinals and toilets clogged with enormous amounts of paper towels, while other toilet paper was ripped out and thrown to the ground. Another video also showed a student stealing a classmate's pants while the latter was sitting in a bathroom stall.

More serious vandalism attributed to the trend involve broken mirrors and light fixtures, as reported in the North East Independent School District in San Antonio, Texas. In Polk County, Florida, three students were arrested from two high schools, as well as one 15-year-old who was arrested for damaging and stealing soap dispensers at Bartow High School. In Boone County, Kentucky, eight students were charged over the trend, with four receiving theft and four receiving vandalism charges. In Stafford County, Virginia, a student from Stafford Senior High School was charged for vandalizing a park bathroom near the school. In Mohave County, Arizona, a 15-year-old was arrested for stealing a school toilet paper dispenser.

Public response

In addition to schools and police warning students against the trend, various media commentators condemned the trend. Daily Show host Trevor Noah joked that, "When the U.S. government said you can't trust TikTok because it's a Chinese plot, I won't lie — I didn't believe it. But now I'm starting to see it. Because China's figured it out: You don't need to fight this country — you just need to convince Americans to go viral and they’ll just destroy themselves."

Accusations of weaponization and moral panic 
In March 2022, The Washington Post wrote that the devious lick challenge was used as part of an orchestrated campaign by Meta Platforms, which hired Republican consulting firm Targeted Victory to propagate news stories about the challenge and damage TikTok's public reputation. Journalist Brock Colyar of Curbed additionally demonstrated that three separate videos of supposed "devious licks" were, in fact, all staged, with one video of a student supposedly stealing a microscope actually being of a microscope the student owned at home, and critiqued the media and political response as a moral panic.

Angelic yields
After the media backlash and crackdown on devious licks, some TikTok users began participating in a countertrend known as "angelic yields", where users anonymously donated items to their schools, such as bottles of soap and rolls of toilet paper, typically to replace whatever had been stolen during a devious lick, or to hide a gift for someone to find, often in the form of a small amount of cash.

Platform response
The original devious lick video was removed on September 13, and TikTok subsequently began removing videos featuring the trend. The trend was banned by TikTok on September 15 for violating TikTok's Community Guidelines against illegal activities, by which time the "devious" hashtag had over 235 million views. Searching for related hashtags results in a message about TikTok's Community Guidelines.

See also
Milk crate challenge, a physically dangerous TikTok challenge which also gained popularity in 2021
Censorship of TikTok

Notes

References

2020s fads and trends
TikTok
Vandalism
Crime
Juvenile delinquency
Theft
Internet memes introduced in 2021